Ike MacKay (born August 2, 1948) is a Canadian former soccer forward.

Club career
A Nanaimo area product, MacKay graduated from Oak Bay High School. MacKay played four North American Soccer League seasons.  He played for the Vancouver Royals in the league's inaugural season, 1968.  MacKay later played three seasons with the Portland Timbers, scoring 3 goals in 10 games in 1976, 1 goal in 16 games in 1977, and 2 assists in 24 games in 1978.  He missed eleven games of the 1978 North American Soccer League season as the Nanaimo school board would not approve a leave of absence from his teaching position.

International career
MacKay played nine times, scoring one goal, for the Canadian national soccer team. He played in four 1974 FIFA World Cup qualification matches in 1972, scoring a goal against the Americans in a 2–2 draw. Canada failed to advance. He later played five times in 1977 in qualifying for the 1978 World Cup.

MacKay was also an Olympic soccer team member, playing in one qualifying match for the 1968 Summer Olympics. Canada lost the match played in Edmonton 1–2 to Cuba and failed to advance. He also played for the Canadian Futsal team at the 1983 Pan American Cup.

International goals
Scores and results list Canada's goal tally first.

References

External links
 NASL stats
 
 FIFA player profile

1948 births
Living people
Canadian expatriate sportspeople in the United States
Canadian expatriate soccer players
Canadian men's futsal players
Canada men's international soccer players
Canadian soccer players
Canadian people of Scottish descent
Expatriate soccer players in the United States
Association football forwards
North American Soccer League (1968–1984) players
People from the Regional District of Nanaimo
Portland Timbers (1975–1982) players
Soccer people from British Columbia
Vancouver Royals players